Bond or bonds may refer to:

Common meanings
 Bond (finance), a type of debt security
 Bail bond, a commercial third-party guarantor of surety bonds in the United States
 Fidelity bond, a type of insurance policy for employers
 Chemical bond, the attraction of atoms, ions or molecules to form chemical compounds

People
 Bond (surname)
 Bonds (surname)
 Mr. Bond (musician), Austrian rapper

Arts and entertainment 
 James Bond, a series of works about the eponymous fictional character
 James Bond (literary character), a British secret agent in a series of novels and films
 Bond (band), an Australian/British string quartet
 Bond: Video Clip Collection, a video collection from the band
 Bond (Canadian band), a Canadian rock band in the 1970s
 The Bond (2007 book), an American autobiography written by The Three Doctors
 The Bond, a 1918 film by Charlie Chaplin supporting Liberty bonds
 Bond International Casino, a former music venue in New York City
 Bonds (The Walking Dead), an episode of the television series The Walking Dead

Places

Antarctica
 Bond Glacier, at the head of Vincennes Bay
 Bond Nunatak, Adelaide Island

Australia
 Bond Island, Queensland, in the Torres Strait

Canada
 Bond Inlet, a body of water in Hudson Strait
 Bond Street, Toronto

England
 Bond Street, a major shopping street in the West End of London
 Bond Street station, a major tube station in London
 Bonds, Lancashire, an English village

United States

 Bond, Colorado
 Bond, Mississippi
 Bond, Tennessee
 Bond Street (Manhattan), New York City
 Bond Court Building, the former name of a highrise in Cleveland, Ohio
 Bond Falls, a waterfall in the Ontonagon River, Michigan
 Bond House (disambiguation), various National Registered Historic Places in the United States
 Bonds, Indiana

Outer space 
 Bond (crater), a crater on Mars

Brands and enterprises 
 Bond (wine), a California cult wine producer
 Bond Arms, a Texas gun manufacturer
 Bond Aviation Group, a British helicopter operator
 Bond Bridge, an ethernet to IR bridge 
 Bond Cars Ltd, a small-scale car manufacturer between 1949 and 1971
 Bond Clothing Stores, a former New York clothing company
 Bond Education Group, a Canadian operator of private schools
 Bonds (clothing), Australian clothing company
 Bonds, formerly the name of a department store in Chelmsford, Essex, now called Debenhams Chelmsford
 Bonds, formerly the name of a department store in Norwich, England, now called John Lewis Norwich

Education 
 Bond University, Gold Coast, Australia
 Bond South Africa, South African campus of Bond University

Organizations 
 British Overseas NGOs for Development, operating as Bond, the membership body for UK-based NGOs working in international development
 Brotherhood Organization of a New Destiny (BOND), created by Jesse Lee Peterson

Other uses
 BOND, RAD software tool
 Bond (sheep), an Australian breed of sheep
 Bond paper, a high quality durable writing paper
 Bond (Chinese constellation), both a mansion in the White Tiger constellation and an asterism within that mansion
 Bond, the manner in which the bricks overlap in brickwork
 The Bond of 1844, a treaty between Ghanaian tribes and the British establishing a protectorate over the Gold Coast.

See also 
 
 
 Bond v The Queen, a 2000 High Court of Australia case
 Bond v. United States (2000), a U.S. Supreme Court case regarding the Fourth Amendment
 Peace bond, a protection order from a Canadian court
 Bonde (disambiguation)
 Bond(z), a Japanese manga anthology
 Bonding (disambiguation)